Magali Di Marco Messmer (born 9 September 1971 in La Chaux-de-Fonds, Switzerland), is one of the most seasoned professional elite triathletes and part of the Swiss National Team since 1995. She took part in two Olympic Games, placing 3rd in Sydney (2000) and 13th  in Beijing (2008). She lives in Troistorrents in Valais.

Magali Di Marco Messmer started her triathlon career in 1995 when she had already retired from swimming, and she won the Swiss Championships in the very first year of her new triathlon career. In 2000, she crowned her efforts by winning the bronze medal at the Olympics in Sydney, whereupon she retired temporarily from triathlon.
Living in Monthey together with her husband and working as a manager in an insurance company, she dedicated herself to family life and gave birth to her son Eliah on 2 November 2001.
At the end of the year 2004, however, Magali Di Marco hd her comeback to triathlon and in 2005 she achieved several World Cup top ten positions.
At the Olympics in Beijing in 2008 she placed 13th and in the World Championship Rankings of the year 2009 she was the number 8 among 106 female elite triathletes, so for more than 15 years Magali Di Marco Messmer has now been a match for the best elite triathletes of the world.

In the 15 years from 1995 to 2009 Magali Di Marco Messmer took part in 73 ITU competitions and achieved 43 top ten positions.
In France, Magali Di Marco represents the Triathlon Club Châteauroux in the prestigious Club Championship Series Lyonnaise des Eaux. At the first triathlon of this French circuit in Dunkirk (23 May 2010) she placed 5th and was the best triathlete of her club, at the second triathlon in Beauvais (13 June 2010) she placed 6th and was again among the three , and in Paris (18 July 2010) she also achieved an overall top ten position placing ninth and being again the best of the female Châteuroux triathletes.

ITU and ETU Competitions from 1995 to 2010 
All the following competitions are triathlons and belong to the Elite category.
The list is based upon the official ITU Profile Page.

BG = the sponsor British Gas · DNF = did not finish · DNS = did not start

References

External links 

 Magali Di Marco Messmer's Webpage in French
 Magali Di Marco Messmer's Blog in French

1971 births
Living people
People from La Chaux-de-Fonds
Swiss female triathletes
Olympic triathletes of Switzerland
Triathletes at the 2000 Summer Olympics
Triathletes at the 2008 Summer Olympics
Olympic bronze medalists for Switzerland
Olympic medalists in triathlon
Medalists at the 2000 Summer Olympics
Sportspeople from the canton of Neuchâtel